John "Ian" Cochrane (born 27 April 1959) is a Scottish former footballer, who played as a winger. Cochrane began his career in the mid-1970s with Preston North End before returning to Scotland with Dundee United. After just one match at Tannadice, Cochrane moved west to Greenock Morton, spending three seasons with the Cappielow side. After leaving Ton, Cochrane had spells with Hamilton Academical, Queen of the South, Partick Thistle and Cowdenbeath. It is unclear where his career headed after leaving Cowdenbeath in 1986.

References

External links
 

1959 births
Footballers from Bellshill
Living people
Scottish footballers
English Football League players
Scottish Football League players
Preston North End F.C. players
Dundee United F.C. players
Greenock Morton F.C. players
Hamilton Academical F.C. players
Queen of the South F.C. players
Partick Thistle F.C. players
Cowdenbeath F.C. players
Association football wingers